Bo'ness Football Club was a football club based in Bo'ness, Scotland. The club was a member of the Scottish Football League from 1921 to November 1932, and played at Newtown Park. Their home kit consisted of royal blue shirts and white shorts.

History
The club claimed a foundation date of 1881, although there is reference to a Bo'ness Football Club existing in 1878.  The earliest record of a match is of a pair of fixtures against the Grasshoppers club's second XI of Bonnybridge in late 1881.  The club moved to Newtown Park in 1886, opening the ground with a fixture against Dumbarton F.C., losing 4-0.

It joined the Eastern Football Alliance in 1891, but the league failed to complete its first season. After winning the East of Scotland Shield in 1894–95, Bo'ness returned to competitive league football in 1901 as a member of the Central Football Combination and eventually ended up in the Central Football League. Along with much of the membership of the group, Bo'ness were admitted to the newly expanded Scottish Football League Second Division in 1921. After five seasons of mid-table finishes, the club won the Second Division championship in 1927 and were promoted to the First Division.

The club was relegated back to the Second Division after just one season. Bo'ness then struggled financially, like many other clubs in the region, due to the decline of the local coal and shale oil industries. Bo'ness offered free admission to local unemployed people after 30 minutes of play. The club struggled to raise the £50 match guarantee to visiting clubs in 1931, but was surprisingly re-elected. The failure to pay the match guarantees to Stenhousemuir F.C. and Brechin City F.C. in October 1932 meant that the club was expelled from the League; the blame was put on "industrial depression and the opposition of dog racing in neighbouring towns".  The club had an overdraft at the time of £500 and the club's record of 4 wins, 2 draws, and 8 defeats was expunged.

Bo'ness continued as a non-league side until 1939, appearing in the Scottish Football Alliance, Edinburgh and District League, Scottish Football Combination and the East of Scotland Football League. Future Scotland international Alex Munro also came through the ranks at this time. The club survived World War II but merged with local side Bo'ness Cadora to form junior club Bo'ness United in 1945.

Stadium

1881–1885 Field at site of Parish church
1885–1886 Soo Cra Park
1886–1945 Newtown Park.

Scottish Football League record

Notable former players
Players at the club who were also full internationals:
  George Allan
  Willie MacFadyen
  Alex Munro
  Christy Martin

References

External links
 Club history and kits

 
Defunct football clubs in Scotland
Association football clubs established in 1882
Association football clubs disestablished in 1945
Football in Falkirk (council area)
Scottish Football League teams
1882 establishments in Scotland
1945 disestablishments in Scotland
Bo'ness